Elfquest is a tabletop role-playing game published by Chaosium in 1984. Based on Wendy and Richard Pini's Elfquest series of comics, this Basic Role-Playing game was written by Steve Perrin, Sandy Petersen, and Yurek Chodak.

Contents
The first edition boxed set contains:
 A contents sheet.
 Elfbook : information for the players, character creation, game system, skills, elf magic, combat.
 Worldbook : gamemaster information, creatures, three scenarios and Elfquest world background.
 World of Two Moons Map : the world of Elfquest.
 Sample Of Play.
 Reference Sheets.
 Character Sheets: for elves and trolls.
 Dice: 3D6 and 2D20.

Miniatures
Ral Partha released 25 mm miniature figures for Elfquest:

 Wolfriders I. Four standing and four riding elves and four wolves in two different poses.
 Journey to Sorrow's End. Six standing adults, two children, and a horse and rider.
 Personalities. Seven humanoids and the very large serpent Madcoil, was described as follows: "These figures are charming and offer a welcome change from the usual historically-inspired figures.  The difference is between sword-and-sorcery and heroic fantasy, between an age of iron and an age of stone and bronze."

Publication history
Elfquest (1984 first edition box)
The Elfquest Companion (1985). Included random character generation tables, and was included in the paperback second edition. 
The Sea Elves (1985). Introduced information and art provided by the Pinis describing the Sea Elf tribe long before they appeared in any of the comics.
Elfwar (1987). Contained several adventures outside of the comic-book continuity.
Elfquest (1989 second edition book)

Reception
Murray Writtle reviewed Elfquest for White Dwarf #60, giving it an overall rating of 9 out of 10, and stated that "This is really the nicest RPG I have seen to give someone as a present. It would suit especially a new player or the parents of young children, who will undoubtedly love the elves wholeheartedly, but also any player who really cares about The Story."

Elfquest did not sell nearly as well as hoped. Sandy Petersen, who worked at Chaosium at the time Elfquest was developed, blames this on it being given to the same developer as the new edition of Runequest which was being worked on at the same time, which resulted in Elfquest being used as a 'test bed' for complex mechanics that were going to be used in Runequest. Petersen speculates that the resulting game was much more complex than fans of the Elfquest comics were likely prepared for.

Reviews
Fantasy Gamer #6
The V.I.P. of Gaming Magazine #2
Different Worlds #46
 Casus Belli #22 (Oct 1984)
Asimov's Science Fiction v9 n7 (1985 07)

References

Basic Role-Playing System
Chaosium games
Elfquest
Fantasy role-playing games
Role-playing games based on comics
Role-playing games introduced in 1984